Richville may refer to a community in the United States:

 Richville, Michigan
 Richville, Douglas County, Missouri
 Richville, Holt County, Missouri
 Richville, Minnesota
 Richville, New York
 Richville, Ohio